Jabbar (also Romanized as Jabbār) is a village in Mahyar Rural District, in the Central District of Qaen County, South Khorasan Province, Iran. At the 2006 census, its population was 169, in 41 families.

References 

Populated places in Qaen County